The Dreier sisters were four American sisters from New York City, who separately and collectively achieved public recognition for their activism and philanthropic social reform activity.

The sisters were:
 Margaret Dreier Robins (1868–1945), labor leader and philanthropist
 Dorothea A. Dreier (1870–1923), painter
 Mary Elisabeth Dreier (1875–1963), New York social reformer
 Katherine Sophie Dreier (1877–1952), artist, lecturer, art patron and social reformer

References

Sibling groups
American families